is a passenger railway station in located in the town of Shirahama,  Nishimuro District, Wakayama Prefecture, Japan, operated by West Japan Railway Company (JR West).

Lines
Limited express trains named "Kuroshio" stop at this station and part of those return to Shin-Osaka and Kyoto.

Station layout
The station consists of one side platform and one island platform connected to the station building by a footbridge with escalators. The side platform has a cut-out, forming a partial bay platform. The station has a Midori no Madoguchi staffed ticket office.

Platforms

Adjacent stations

|-
!colspan=5|West Japan Railway Company (JR West)

History
It was renamed to its present name on March 1, 1965. The current station building was completed on October 1, 1985. With the privatization of the Japan National Railways (JNR) on April 1, 1987, the station came under the aegis of the West Japan Railway Company.

Passenger statistics
In fiscal 2019, the station was used by an average of 709 passengers daily (boarding passengers only).

Surrounding Area
Adventure World
Kumano Kodo
Nanki Shirahama Spa

See also
List of railway stations in Japan

References

External links

 Shirahama Station (West Japan Railway) 

Railway stations in Wakayama Prefecture
Railway stations in Japan opened in 1933
Shirahama, Wakayama